Driftless Pony Club is a Chicago, Illinois-based indie rock band. Its lead singer and guitarist is Craig Benzine, who also produces YouTube videos under the alias "WheezyWaiter". After releasing two albums (2004's Janel and 2006's Cholera) on the Madison, Wisconsin-based Sector Five Records,  the band signed with DFTBA Records, on which they released their first profitable release, the EP Expert, in August 2009. Driftless Pony Club has toured across the United States multiple times, and has performed in lineups with other bands affiliated with DFTBA Records including Hank Green and the Perfect Strangers, Andrew Huang, Rob Scallon, and Harry and the Potters.

Discography
 Janel (2004)
 Cholera (2006)
 Expert (2009)
 Buckminster (2011)
 Magnicifent (2012)
 Zastera (2016)

References

External links
Official website

Indie rock musical groups from Illinois
Musical groups from Chicago
Musical groups established in 2000